In Greek mythology, Clio, also spelled Kleio, is the muse of history, or in a few mythological accounts, the muse of lyre playing.

Etymology 
Clio's name is etymologically derived from the Greek root κλέω/κλείω (meaning "to recount", "to make famous" or "to celebrate"). The name's traditional Latinisation is Clio, but some modern systems such as the American Library Association-Library of Congress system use K to represent the original Greek kappa, and ei to represent the diphthong ει (epsilon iota), thus Kleio.

Depiction 
Clio, sometimes referred to as "the Proclaimer", is often represented with an open parchment scroll, a book, or a set of tablets.

Mythology 
Like all the muses, Clio is a daughter of Zeus and the Titaness Mnemosyne, goddess of memory. Along with her sister Muses, she is considered to dwell at either Mount Helicon or Mount Parnassos. Other common locations for the Muses are Pieria in Thessaly, near to Mount Olympus.

She had one son, Hyacinth, with one of several kings, in various mythswith Pierus or with king Oebalus of Sparta, or with king Amyclas, progenitor of the people of Amyclae, dwellers about Sparta. Some sources say she is also the mother of Hymenaios. According to Apollodorus, Clio was made to fall in love with Pierus by Aphrodite, for Clio had derided her for her love affair with Adonis. Other accounts credit her as the mother of Linus, a poet who was buried at Argos, although Linus has a number of differing parents depending upon the account, including several accounts in which he is the son of Clio's sisters Urania or Calliope.

Legacy 
In her capacity as "the proclaimer, glorifier and celebrator of history, great deeds and accomplishments,"

Clio is used in the name of various modern brands, including the Clio Awards for excellence in advertising. The Cambridge University History Society is informally referred to as Clio; the Cleo of Alpha Chi society at Trinity College, Connecticut is named after the muse.  Likewise, the undergraduate student outreach group for the Penn Museum at the University of Pennsylvania is known as the Clio Society and Geneseo College’s oldest society is 'Clio'. 'Clio' also represents history in some coined words in academic usage: cliometrics, cliodynamics.

Clio Bay in Antarctica is named after the muse.

Gallery

See also 
 Muses in popular culture

Notes

General and cited references 
 Pausanias, Description of Greece with an English Translation by W.H.S. Jones, Litt.D., and H.A. Ormerod, M.A., in 4 Volumes. Cambridge, MA, Harvard University Press; London, William Heinemann Ltd. 1918. . Online version at the Perseus Digital Library
 Pausanias, Graeciae Descriptio. 3 vols. Leipzig, Teubner. 1903.  Greek text available at the Perseus Digital Library.
 Pseudo-Apollodorus, The Library with an English Translation by Sir James George Frazer, F.B.A., F.R.S. in 2 Volumes, Cambridge, MA, Harvard University Press; London, William Heinemann Ltd. 1921. . Online version at the Perseus Digital Library. Greek text available from the same website.

Further reading 
 Bartelink, Dr. G. J. M. (1988). Prisma van de mythologie. Utrecht: Het Spectrum.
 van Aken, Dr. A. R. A. (1961). Elseviers Mythologische Encyclopedie. Amsterdam: Elsevier.

External links 

 Warburg Institute Iconographic Database (c. 40 images of Clio)
 KLEIO from The Theoi Project

Children of Zeus
Deeds of Aphrodite
Greek Muses
Greek goddesses
Historiography of Greece
Metamorphoses characters
Music and singing goddesses
Pierian mythology
Wisdom goddesses